Obolo (or Andoni) is a major Cross River language of Nigeria. Obolo is the indigenous name of a community in the eastern Delta of the River Niger, better known as Andoni (the origin of this latter name being uncertain). Obolo refers to the people, the language as well as the land.

Dialects
There are six major dialect groups in the language, namely: (from west to east): Ataba, Unyeada, Ngo, Okoroete, Iko and Ibot Obolo. Ngo is the prestige dialect, hence the standard literary form of Obolo draws heavily from it.

Obolo literature
 The Bible in Obolo was published by the Obolo Language and Bible Translation Organization in 2012. Obolo is the 23rd Nigerian language to have the complete Bible.
 An Obolo-language website was launched in 2016.
 The first literary material on Literature in the Mother-Tongue; a novel for Junior Secondary Schools and public readership, "Mbuban Îchaka" by Isidore Ene-Awaji © Obolo  Language  &  Bible  Translation  Project, was published in 2010.

Writing System
Obolo language is written in the Latin script. The alphabet is as follows:

 The characters in bracket are dialect-specific.
 Tone marks can be added to some letters. The tone bearers are the vowels a, e, i, o, ọ, u as well as m and n.

Obolo is a tone language. There are five tones in the language: low, high, mid, falling and rising tone. In writing, only the low tone and falling tone are indicated. Tones are marked compulsorily on the first syllables of verbs and verbal groups. For other classes of words, a standard literature will show the way to go.

OLBTO

References

Indigenous languages of Rivers State
Lower Cross River languages
Languages of Nigeria